George William Evans (5 January 1780 – 16 October 1852) was a surveyor and early explorer in the Colony of New South Wales. Evans was born in Warwick, England, migrating to Australia in October 1802.

Early career
In 1803, Evans was appointed acting Surveyor General of New South Wales whilst Charles Grimes was on leave in England. In 1804, Evans explored the Warragamba River and upstream to the present site of the Warragamba Dam. Later removed from the position by Governor Philip Gidley King he was posted to the position of Assistant Surveyor by Lieutenant-Governor William Paterson. Evans surveyed the shores of Jervis Bay and inland to Appin leading the way to the settlement of the Illawarra region. Probably because of his success it was Governor Lachlan Macquarie who instructed him to find a passage to the west.

Exploration of the inland

Confirmatory Blue Mountains expedition, 1813

On 13 November 1813 Governor Lachlan Macquarie sent Evans across the Blue Mountains into the Wiradjuri nation of central-western New South Wales to confirm the findings of the exploration party of Blaxland, Lawson, and Wentworth. He was the first European to record meeting with the Wiradjuri people of the region.

Evans generally followed the route of Blaxland, Lawson and Wentworth, reaching the end of their route on 26 November 1813 at a point that Evans then named Mount Blaxland. Evans' party then moved on and visited the Fish River area and further west near the junction of the now named Fish and Campbell Rivers and described two plains in his view, the O'Connell Plains and the Macquarie Plains. It was on 9 December that he reached the site of present-day Bathurst.

After the explorations that took seven weeks Governor Macquarie awarded Evans £100 and 1000 acres of land near Richmond in Van Diemen's Land (now Tasmania). Evans departed for Van Diemen's Land in 1814 but was back in NSW by 1815 to continue inland explorations.

First Lachlan River expedition, 1815

In May 1815, Evans set off from Bathurst at the direction of governor Macquarie, on an expedition to explore the Lachlan River. He became the first colonial explorer to enter the Lachlan Valley, in the Central West region of New South Wales. Evans was Deputy Surveyor-General and named the area the Oxley Plains after his superior, the Surveyor-General, John Oxley. A cairn on the North Logan Road, 13 kilometres from Cowra was unveiled in 1978 on private property to mark the site where Evans, accompanied by his exploring party comprising George Kane (alias Thos. Appledore), James Butler, Patrick Byrne and John Tighe, sighted the Lachlan River and named the surrounding district, Oxley's Plains in 1815.

He was also the first European to visit the Abercrombie and Belubula River Valleys, and the first through the areas that now include the towns of Boorowa and Cowra.

On 1 June 1815 George William Evans and his group marked a tree at the junction of the Lachlan river and a creek which he named Byrnes Creek (after Patrick Byrnes, a convict member of his party). This junction is located in present-day Eugowra. This point was the furthest west any Europeans had travelled into the country.

On 1 June 1815 Evans was running short of provisions so returned to Bathurst, where he arrived on 12 June 1815. This journey opened the way for later explorations, mainly by John Oxley. Evans took part in some of Oxley's expeditions.

Second Lachlan River expedition, 1817
Evans returned to Tasmania in 1817 but was again to return to New South Wales to journey with his superior John Oxley on travels into the Lachlan River areas.

Macquarie River expedition ending Port Macquarie, 1818
Evans set out on a second expedition to explore the Macquarie River, as assistant to Surveyor-General Oxley, departing from Bathurst in May 1818.  This exploring expedition would follow the Macquarie River until it reached the Macquarie Marshes, and would finally end up on the east coast at Port Macquarie. In this expedition, Evans became the first white man to encounter the Castlereagh River.

In early July 1818, the party was at Mt Harris, 48 km (30 miles) N-NW of present-day Warren, having returned from the Macquarie Marshes seemingly unable to follow the further course of the Macquarie. Oxley had to change his plans since he couldn't follow the Macquarie any further so he sent Evans on to scout ahead, with a small party, to attempt a north-easterly route across the plains and report back. Effectively, Evans would traverse a large loop, heading northeasterly then south westerly, westerly and back to his starting point. Beginning on 8 July 1818 in the north-easterly direction, he first crossed the Castlereagh River around Combara, between Gulargambone and Coonamble. The party then continued on a shallow north-easterly direction until reaching the foothills of the Warrumbungle mountains. From here, Evans started to head back to Oxley's encampment at Mt Harris by turning southwesterly, travelling across land he described as 'an open plain, over which was rather better travelling than we had latterly experienced'. This route brought his party back to the Castlereagh River at a more southerly point than his first crossing, in an area between the future villages of Armatree and Curban (15 miles apart). As he approached the Castlereagh River he described the country as 'low and wet' with their journey being 'dreadfully bad and marshy'.

Once Evans' scouting party had returned, (17 July) the whole expedition departed on 19 July 1818 in the same north-easterly direction George Evans had taken. On 27 July they reached the Castlereagh, but it was now flooded since Evans' first crossing two weeks earlier. Only on 2 August did Evans again cross the Castlereagh near Combara, once there was a sufficient drop in the river level. This time on reaching the Warrumbungles south-east of their crossing, the party continued easterly through the Goorianawa Gap, on past the Liverpool Plains, and eventually reached the coast near Port Macquarie. John Oxley named the river that year in honour of the British Foreign Secretary, Lord Castlereagh, who had held the position since 1812.

Later life and death
Accusations were made about irregular payments made to Evans whilst in the Surveyor-General's position and he was despatched by ship to England to explain the matter to Lord Bathurst, Secretary of State for War and the Colonies. He sailed for England on 14 November 1826. It appears Lieutenant-Governor George Arthur found it difficult to positively prove the accusations with a general loose attitude to payments within that office. Arthur even supported Evans' request for a retirement pension. Evans returned to New South Wales about six years later and was shown as a stationer / bookseller in Bridge Street, Sydney. The last ten years of his life was spent at Hobart Town, where he died on 16 October 1852. Evans' and his wife Lucy Parris' headstone is at St Andrew's Anglican Church, Evandale, moved from St John's Church, Newtown, Hobart, Tasmania

Other activities
Evans was known as an artist of some note, some of his aquatints and watercolours are held at the Dixson Library of New South Wales. He was also a teacher at King's School, an independent Anglican boarding school for boys in North Parramatta in the western suburbs of Sydney, Australia. Founded in 1831, it is Australia's oldest independent school.

Memorials to Evans
(1) A standing bronze portrait on a large rusticated sandstone plinth of Evans is located in Kings Parade (Park) at Bathurst in the Central Tablelands region of inland New South Wales. The memorial was built in 1913 by the citizens of Bathurst to commemorate the 100 years since his exploration of the Bathurst region.

(2) Near Evans' first crossing of the Castlereagh River in July 1818, south of the township of Coonamble, a memorial has been erected commemorating this event. the plaque, set against a standing local stone, reads: "The Castlereagh River was discovered 2 km south of this point on 11 · 7 · 1818  / By Surveyor Evans, Second in Command of Oxley`s Exploring Expedition."

See also
 List of Blue Mountains articles
 Bathurst, New South Wales
 European exploration of Australia

References

External links
 

1780 births
1852 deaths
People from Tasmania
Explorers of Australia
People from Warwick
People from the Blue Mountains (New South Wales)
19th-century Australian public servants
English emigrants to colonial Australia
Australian landscape painters
Australian booksellers
History of the Blue Mountains (New South Wales)
19th-century Australian businesspeople